Siyoli Waters (born 31 January 1983) is a professional squash player who represents South Africa.

Waters was born in East London, Eastern Cape.  She reached a career-high world ranking of World No. 28 in October 2013.

References

External links 

Living people
1983 births
South African female squash players